Trostan (meaning 'pole/staff') is a mountain in County Antrim, Northern Ireland and at 551 metres (1,808 feet) is the highest point in the county.

See also

Lists of mountains in Ireland
List of Irish counties by highest point
List of mountains of the British Isles by height
List of Marilyns in the British Isles

References

Mountains and hills of County Antrim
Highest points of Irish counties